"Phuture Vibes" is a 1999 single by Mellow Trax. It reached No. 15 on the Austrian Singles Chart.

In popular culture
DJ Sammy kicks off his debut album DJ Sammy at Work (In the Mix) with this song.

References

1999 singles
1999 songs